Later is a nightly half-hour-long late-night talk show that ran on NBC from 1988 until 2001. Later typically aired for half an hour four nights a week at 1:30 a.m. following Late Night with David Letterman from 1988 to 1993, and Late Night with Conan O'Brien from 1993 to 2001. It was hosted by Bob Costas from 1988 to 1994, Greg Kinnear from 1994 to 1996, various guest hosts from 1996 to 2000, and finally Cynthia Garrett (the first African-American woman to host a network late-night show) from 2000 until 2001. Later was succeeded by Last Call with Carson Daly in 2002.

Nominations and awards
During Bob Costas's tenure as host, the show won the 1993 Primetime Emmy Award for Outstanding Informational Series. It was nominated in the same category in 1992, and in the Outstanding Achievement in Graphic Design and Title Sequences category (currently called the Main Title Design category) in 1989.

History

1988–1994: Bob Costas
Sportscaster Bob Costas was the first host of Later, hosting from 1988 until 1994.

In the summer of 1988, NBC decided to again start producing original programming in the 1:30 a.m. Monday-Thursday slot following an almost 5-year period—ever since NBC News Overnight went off the air in late fall 1983—during which the time slot had been vacant and local affiliates either signed off for the night or programmed the airtime themselves. Created and produced by Dick Ebersol, the new program was something of a break from the typical American late night TV talk show format of the era; featuring Costas and a single guest having an intense conversation for the entire half hour—without a house band, opening monologue, studio audience or guest musical performances, close to what Tom Snyder had done on Tomorrow in a similar timeslot during the 1970s and would again do on The Late Late Show in the mid-1990s.

By the time he got hired for NBC's new late-night talk show, 36-year-old Costas had been with NBC Sports for almost a decade, most prominently as the studio host of their NFL coverage—occasionally getting to branch out into longer form interviews with various athletes. Additionally, since 1983, he had been making regular appearances on Late Night with David Letterman as part of the show's comedy pieces—mostly as a straight man sportscaster providing live commentary of absurd 'events' thought up by Letterman's writing staff, such as elevator or fire extinguisher races in the RCA Building and search for the Late Night baby. According to Costas, it was in fact Letterman—an admirer of his sports interviews—who had something to do with Costas getting what turned out to be the Later job by suggesting that the sportscaster could do a late night talk show to senior vice president of NBC Sports Dick Ebersol who had influence beyond NBC Sports owing to a close friendship with the president of NBC's entertainment division Brandon Tartikoff.

Later was taped in New York City at GE Building's famous Studio 8H, and occasionally in Los Angeles. Costas interviewed a single guest for 45 minutes to an hour in real time before turning the material over to editors, who condensed it down to 22 minutes plus commercials. On several occasions, an interview with a particularly noteworthy guest (examples include Paul McCartney, David Crosby, Bob Seger, Don Rickles, Jerry Lewis, David Letterman, Garry Shandling, Siskel & Ebert, Mel Brooks, Roger Corman, Robert Duvall and Martin Scorsese) was shown over multiple nights. These in-depth discussions won Costas much praise for his interviewing skills. Costas resided in St. Louis all through his run on Later, flying to New York City once per week to shoot a week worth of shows, recording all four in a single day.

Guests during the first week on air were Linda Ellerbee, Gary Coleman and Billy Crystal. Only weeks into its run, Later was preempted for NBC's presentation of the 1988 Summer Olympics in Seoul with Costas hosting the network's Olympic late-night coverage.

Later occasionally had guest hosts substituting for Costas, including Pat Sajak, Katie Couric, Chris Connelly, Matt Lauer, and Tom Snyder. Guest host Snyder's March 22, 1991 interview with the thirty-seven-year-old New York City based shock jock Howard Stern—whose raunchy morning drive-time radio show, in addition to New York, had been syndicated to two more U.S. East Coast markets and who came on Later to plug his Crucified by the FCC CD boxset—was particularly notable since the host and guest, while mostly remaining cordial and civil, aggressively and sarcastically expressed dislike for each other throughout the interview, often engaging in heated, testy, and uncomfortable exchanges. Though the two met face to face for the first (and last) time on this occasion, former NBC late night host Snyder now doing a nightly radio show for ABC Radio and syndicated morning shock jock Stern heard in the New York City, Philadelphia, and D.C. radio markets had had a prior record of mutual attack on their respective media outlets that continued after the show.

On Thursday, October 3, 1991, Later'''s hour-long three-year anniversary special aired at 11:30 p.m. on NBC, a time slot normally reserved for The Tonight Show Starring Johnny Carson.

In late January 1993, to celebrate its fifth year on the air, Later aired a special anniversary show from Los Angeles on the Saturday before that year's Super Bowl being held in Pasadena with Costas pulling double duty that weekend on Later as well as on NBC Sports' Super Bowl coverage.

During one of his last shows, Costas said personal considerations led to his decision to leave Later. He did not want to move his family to New York and felt worn out by the workload consisting of his obligations with NBC Sports and his duties on Later. Costas' last episode, an hour-long special, aired Friday, February 25, 1994. In January 2019, after leaving NBC, he expressed interest in reviving Later on another network.

After making a much-publicized switch to CBS, David Letterman (who had until June 1993 hosted Later's NBC lead-in Late Night with David Letterman) and his production company offered Costas a hosting job on the newly-launched The Late Late Show, based on his performance and exposure on Later. CBS also offered Costas a correspondent role on 60 Minutes if he accepted Letterman's offer. Costas declined, however, citing his relationship with Ebersol and his desire to remain with NBC Sports. Instead, Tom Snyder would become the inaugural host of The Late Late Show, which began its run in January 1995.

1994–1996: Greg Kinnear
Following Costas's departure in February 1994, Later reverted to a conventional late night talk show format, with Greg Kinnear becoming the new host. His first episode aired February 28, 1994.

The show relocated to Los Angeles, where it was taped at NBC Studios in Burbank, California with an opening monologue, studio audience, and comedy bits as well as quick one-segment interview with contemporary TV and movie personalities plugging their projects. Simultaneous to his duties on Later, Kinnear continued hosting Talk Soup on E! as well as fostering his budding acting career. Sometime during 1995, he quit Talk Soup and in December of the same year the movie Sabrina opened, a big-budget motion picture remake in which Kinnear had a notable supporting role. The favorable exposure led to more movie offers for Kinnear, and he quit Later.

1996–2000: Guest hostsFriday Night host Rita Sever was the most consistent guest host during this period of time. Other guest hosts came from just about any facet of public life in the United States, including the supermodel Cindy Crawford and actress/comedienne Lynne Koplitz.

 2000–2001: Cynthia Garrett 
In December 1999, NBC issued a press release announcing former VH1 VJ Cynthia Garrett, who had guest hosted twice that month, as its permanent host saying: "The show attracted its largest audience in nine months in the key adult 18-49 demographic." Garrett debuted on January 31, 2000, interviewing Lenny Kravitz. Returning to the show's initial Bob Costas-led format, Garrett interviewed guests such as Laurence Fishburne, Joe Montana, Angela Bassett, Leah Remini and Magic Johnson.

The program was canceled in December 2000, with the final episode airing in January 2001. Garrett became an on-air personality for the then-new TV Guide Channel. Around this time, NBC began to negotiate with Carson Daly to take over the Later timeslot, but this would not happen for well over a year.

2001–2002: Later presents SCTV
Following the end of Later, the time slot was used for time- and content-edited repeats of the Canadian sketch comedy SCTV, a show which had previously aired on NBC from 1981 through 1983. A new voice-over introduction by Rita Sever presented the program as "Later presents...SCTV", but the series was otherwise identical to the syndicated SCTV repeats that had been airing for years.

In 2001, NBC announced that MTV VJ Carson Daly would be the new host of Later. However, when Daly took over the time slot in January 2002, the Later name was retired, and the show went on the air as Last Call with Carson Daly, a show that would run in several iterations until September 2019, when it was replaced with A Little Late with Lilly Singh.  This show ran until June 3, 2021, at which point NBC gave the former Later'' timeslot back to its affiliates.

See also
 List of late-night American network TV programs

References

External links
 

1988 American television series debuts
2001 American television series endings
NBC original programming
1980s American late-night television series
1990s American late-night television series
2000s American late-night television series
NBC late-night programming